The Changing World Order: Why Nations Succeed and Fail is a 2021 book by Ray Dalio.

Description
According to the writer, nation success depends on the cycles and like business cycles, empires have cycles too. So, it is inevitable for a country to exist forever. As per him, most important factor in the success of a nation is their investment in education.

The book covers five centuries of history.

Reception
The book was reviewed by The Wall Street Journal in 2019. In 2022, it was included in the Toronto Star's list.

References

2021 non-fiction books
Simon & Schuster books